Eagle Rock is an unincorporated community in Wake County, North Carolina, United States. Southeastern Free Will Baptist College lies within the community. The Hood-Anderson Farm is located in Eagle Rock and is listed on the National Register of Historic Places.

References

External links
 Eagle Rock at the U.S. Geographic Names Information System

Research Triangle
Unincorporated communities in North Carolina
Unincorporated communities in Wake County, North Carolina